Liza Kate Pulman (born 1969) is a British singer and actress. 
She is an acclaimed solo singer and comedienne and one third of the satirical comedy trio Fascinating Aïda. As a member of the group, she received Drama Desk Award nominations in 2005 and 2010. Pulman has an extensive career that encompasses music, theatre, comedy, writing and presenting.

Biography

Early life
Born in 1969 in Westminster, Pulman is the daughter of the actress Barbara Young and the screenwriter Jack Pulman. She has an older sister, Cory, and when they were teenagers they sang together as "the Pulman Sisters", singing numbers from the Roaring Twenties through to the 1940s in the foyers of the Royal Festival Hall and the National Theatre. Pulman then trained at the Guildhall School of Music and Drama for six years and was taken on as a junior principal with the Glyndebourne Chorus.

Personal life
Pulman married firstly the Irish-born actor David Ganly and secondly Steve Hutt, the manager of Fascinating Aida. She lives in Cornwall with her husband.

Pulman was on the London Underground train which was bombed in the 7 July 2005 London bombings; her mobile phone footage of the experience was broadcast on international television, and her article was published in the G2 section of The Guardian.

Career
Pulman appeared in The Gondoliers and The Coffee House at the Chichester Festival Theatre. Her acting credits include her portrayal of Violet in the London Palladium's production of Chitty Chitty Bang Bang, and she starred opposite Phillip Schofield and Russ Abbot in the British national tour of Doctor Dolittle.

She has also played Cathy in Wuthering Heights (European tour), Eurydice in the world premiere of Harrison Birtwistle's The Second Mrs. Kong (Glyndebourne Festival Opera), and leading roles with Music Theatre London, the D'Oyly Carte Opera Company and the Carl Rosa Opera Company. Her many cabaret performances include Listen Up! with composer and lyricist Jason Carr. She appeared in Dick Whittington at the Watford Palace Theatre from November 2008 to January 2009.

In 2016, Pulman toured with her solo show 'Liza Pulman Sings Hollywood'. In 2017 she created the solo show "Liza Pulman Sings Streisand" which she continued to tour in 2018. This played to sell-out houses and had 5-Star reviews at numerous theatres, including London's Cadogan Hall, Wilton's Music Hall, Andrew Lloyd-Webber's The Other Palace, and a run at the Lyric Theatre on Shaftesbury Avenue. In 2021 Pulman's new show "The Heart of It" had to be postponed until April 2022, when it opened at the Riverside Studios, Hammersmith, together with the release of her new album recorded at Peter Gabriel's Real World Studios, produced by Chris Porter. In 2021 and 2022 she again toured with Fascinating Aida around the British Isles.

Fascinating Aïda
Pulman joined Fascinating Aïda in 2004 and has sung in their albums, including Absolutely Fascinating, and in the DVD Silver Jubilee. As a member of Fascinating Aïda, she received a Drama Desk Award nomination in 2005 for the group's performances in New York. In 2015, she was touring England with Charm Offensive Fascinating Aïda, soon after the group had completed a new CD and DVD called Cheap Flights. In August 2016 it had a run at the Edinburgh Festival Fringe called 'Back in the Saddle' and released a DVD and CD.

Credits

2022 "Liza Pulman The Heart of It," Riverside Studios, Joseph Atkins
2021-2022 Fascinating Aïda, Brand New Show, UK Tour, Paul Foster
2017–2018 "Liza Pulman Sings Streisand"
2016, Fascinating Aïda, "Back in the Saddle", Fringe
2016, "Liza Pulman Sings Hollywood"
2013, Fascinating Aïda, Charm Offensive, UK tour, Pip Broughton
2013, Stage, Amanda, Sleeping Arrangements, Landor Theatre, Rob McWhir
2011, Stage, Lead, Let's Misbehave, Salisbury Playhouse, Simon Green
2011, Stage, Margaret, Molly Wobbly's Tit Factory, Lyric, Belfast, Paul Boyd
2011, Stage, Company, Mean Time (Workshop), Menier Chocolate Factory, Jonathan Butterell
2011, Stage, Fairy Godmother, Pericles, Regents Park Open Air Theatre, Natalie Abrahami
2010, Fascinating Aïda, Pearls before Wine, UK tour, Frank Thompson
2009, Fascinating Aïda, Absolutely Miraculous, UK tour, Frank Thompson
2008, Fairy Bowbells, Dick Whittington, Watford Palace Theatre, Joyce Branagh
2008, Fascinating Aïda, UK tour, Frank Thompson
2008, The Black & White Ball, King's Head Theatre, Matthew White
2007, The Mother, Take Flight, Menier Chocolate Factory, Sam Buntrock
2007, Mrs Lindburgh, Take Flight, Menier Chocolate Factory, Sam Buntrock
2007, Mrs Darling, Peter Pan, QDOS/Bristol Hippodrome
2006, Little Red Riding Hood, Into the Woods, Derby Playhouse, Karen Louise Hebbdon
2006, Midsomer Murders, TV series, episode "Dance With the Dead", as a 1940s crooner.
2006, Fascinating Aïda, Absolutely Fabulous, Theater Row, 42nd Street, New York, Simon Green
2005, Fanny in Fanny (Sadler's Wells, Lost Musicals Season)
Violet in the original cast of Chitty Chitty Bang Bang (London Palladium)
2003, Tessa in The Gondoliers Chichester Festival Theatre
Nephew's Wife in A Christmas Carol (Chichester Festival Theatre)
Emma Fairfax in Doctor Dolittle opposite Phillip Schofield (UK tour)
Mrs Darling in Peter Pan (Swindon)
Goldilocks in Who's Afraid of the Big Bad Book (Soho Theatre)
Lady Nelson in Nelson The Musical (Soho Theatre)
Maid Marian in Robin Hood (Nuffield Theatre, Southampton)
2003, Vittoria in The Coffee House (Minerva, Chichester)
Tatyana in Eugene Onegin
Adele in Die Fledermaus (Lyric Hammersmith/Tour)
Cathy in Wuthering Heights (European Tour)
1998, Brenda Blossom in Hollywood Pinafore (Barbican Cinema 1)
Belinda in Otherwise Engaged (Perth Rep)
Yum-Yum in The Mikado (Carla Rosa, Richmond Theatre, Tour)
Gabrielle in La Vie Parisienne (D'Oyly Carte)

See also 
 Fascinating Aïda
 Dillie Keane
 Adèle Anderson

References

External links 
 
 Liza Pulman at ColeKitchenn (agent)
 Liza Pulman & Fascinating Aïda at Gavin Barker Associates (agent)
 Fascinating Aïda official website

Cabaret singers
English women singers
English stage actresses
Alumni of the Guildhall School of Music and Drama
Living people
1969 births